Vestfjorddalen (West Fjord Valley) is a glacial valley in the inner, western branch, Vestfjorden, of Wijdefjorden. Located in the west of the Indre Wijdefjorden National Park on the divide between Andrée Land and Dickson Land in Spitsbergen, Svalbard in Arctic Norway. It is 12 km long and forks into Universitetsbreen to the south and Lisbetbreen to the northeast.

References

Valleys of Spitsbergen